Iran (formally Persia) possesses an extraordinary treasure of royal jewelry, including a copious amount of mother-of-pearl from the Persian Gulf. The Iranian crown jewels are among the largest, most dazzling and valuable jewel collection in the world. The jewels are displayed in the vaults of the Central Bank of Iran in Tehran, and are one of the most appealing tourist attractions in Iran.

Akik is also exported from Iran to various countries including the Indian subcontinent.

See also 
Iranian Crown Jewels - world's largest jewel collection
Pahlavi Crown
Kooh-i-noor, a jewel formerly in Persian possession, is part of the British crown jewels

References

External links
Iranian National -Royal- Jewels

Persian art
Jewellery
Smuggling